The FC Basel 1906–07 season was their fourteenth season in their existence. The club's chairman was Ernst-Alfred Thalmann, who was chairman for the fourth consecutive year. FC Basel played their home games in the Landhof.

Overview 
Daniel Hug was team captain for the second season in a row. Hug was Basel's most prominent and their largest player and as captain he led the team trainings and was responsible for the line-ups. Basel played five pre-season friendlies, two against German team Freiburger FC, two against German team Karlsruher FV and one against Swiss team Grasshopper Club. Four of these games ended with a defeat, only one ended in a victory. During the first half of the season they played another two friendlies, again one against the Grasshoppers and one against Montriond Lausanne. During the winter break the team travelled to Frankfurt and played against FC Hermannia on Christmas day and against FSV Frankfurt on boxing day. Further winter break friendlies were played away against Freiburger FC and at home in the Landhof against Cantonal Neuchâtel. After the season Basel played two friendly games against Winterthur, who had been runners-up in the east group. The team then travelled to Italy and won both friendlies against AC Milan on Easter Sunday 31 March and Easter Monday 1 April by four goals to three.

The Swiss Serie A season 1906–07 was divided into three regional groups, east, central and west. Together with Young Boys, FC Bern, Aarau and the Old Boys, Basel were allocated to the central group. Basel played their first four games away, losing the consecutive games against Young Boys and Old Boys both 3–4. However, winning the next four consecutive games they climbed the table. As it came to the last group game of the season, at home against the Old Boys, Basel were leading the table two points ahead of their opponents. However, in this last match despite a two-goal lead, the goals being scored by Dr. Siegfried Pfeiffer and Max Senn, their local rivals turned the game and won three goals to two. 

Subsequently it came to a play-off to see who would advance to the finals. The play-off match was interrupted in the 50th minute due to a storm and following the restart it ended in a 1–1 draw. Thus, it required a reply one week later and this was also drawn 1–1. They played 2x 10 minutes extra time, but neither team scored. Therefore, both teams agreed to play a further 15 minutes, but neither team scored. Another week later it then came to a second replay which Basel decided with 4–1 for themselves.

Basel advanced to the finals for the first time in their history. The final was played as a round robin tournament. In the first match they were beaten 1–5 by west group winners Servette and in the second 2–3 by Young Fellows Zürich. Servette won the deciding match and became Swiss champions for the first time in the clubs history.

Players  
Squad members

Results

Legend

Friendly matches

Pre- and mid-season

Winter break to end of season

Serie A 

The Serie A was divided into three regional groups, east, central and west. The winners of each group played a final round robin.

Central group results

Play-off 

1st play-off

2nd play-off

3rd play-off

Central group league table

Finals 
The winners of each regional groups, east, central and west played a final round robin.

Final league table

See also 
 History of FC Basel
 List of FC Basel players
 List of FC Basel seasons

Notes

Footnotes 

1906–1907 season matches: YB-FCB, OB-FCB, FCB-YB, FCB-Aarau

References

Sources 
 Rotblau: Jahrbuch Saison 2014/2015. Publisher: FC Basel Marketing AG. 
 Switzerland 1906-07 at RSSSF
 FCB team 1906-07 at fcb-archiv.ch

External links
 FC Basel official site

FC Basel seasons
Basel